The giant slender bluetongue (Cyclodomorphus maximus) is a species of lizard in the family Scincidae. The species is endemic to Western Australia.

References

Cyclodomorphus
Reptiles described in 1976
Skinks of Australia